Grimontia marina is a Gram-negative, chemoheterotrophic and obligately aerobic bacterium species from the genus of Grimontia which has been isolated from Yellow Sea.

References 

Vibrionales
Bacteria described in 2013